Blackmore (variations include: Blackmoore, Blackmoor, Blackmor) is a surname. Notable people with the surname include:

 Amy Blackmore, Canadian impresario
 Ben Blackmore (born 1993), English rugby league player 
 Bill Blackmore, English footballer, active 1912–1920
 Clayton Blackmore (born 1964), Welsh international footballer
 Clifford Blackmore, Kansas politician
 David Blackmore (1909–1988), Welsh cricketer
 Denis Blackmore, American mathematician
 Edwin Gordon Blackmore (1837–1909), South Australian parliamentary secretary and horseman
Eleanor Blackmore (1873–1943), English Baptist missionary in Nicaragua
 Elizabeth Blackmore (born 1987), Australian actress
 Emilie Blackmore Stapp (1876–1962), American children's author and philanthropist
 Ernest Blackmore (1895–1955), English cricketer
 Frank Blackmore (1916–2008), British airman and traffic engineer
 George Blackmore (1908–1984), English cricketer 
 George Blackmore Guild (1834–1917), American politician
 Ginny Blackmore (born 1986), New Zealand singer-songwriter
 Harold Blackmore (1904–1989), English footballer
 Hedley Blackmore (1901–1992), Australian rules footballer
 Hugh Enes Blackmore (1863–1945), British opera and concert singer
 Jake Blackmore (died 1964), Welsh rugby union player
 John Blackmore (fl. 1634–1657), English politician
 James Blackmore (1821–1875), American politician
 John Horne Blackmore (1890–1971), Canadian politician
 Jürgen Blackmore, British guitarist, son of Ritchie Blackmore
 Leigh Blackmore (born 1959), Australian horror writer and critic
 Lewis Blackmore (1886–1916), Australian rules footballer
 Mahia Blackmore (born 1949), New Zealand singer and band leader
 Neil Blackmore, British novelist
 Penelope Blackmore (born 1984), Australian Olympic gymnast
 Peter Blackmore (footballer) (born 1879), English footballer 
 Peter Blackmore (politician) (born 1945), Australian politician and mayor of Maitland
 R. D. Blackmore (1825–1900), English novelist
 Rachael Blackmore (born 1989), Irish jockey
 Richard Blackmore (1654–1729), English poet and physician
 Richard Blackmore (American football) (born 1956), American football player
 Richie Blackmore (rugby league) (born 1969), New Zealand footballer and coach
 Ritchie Blackmore (born 1945), British rock guitarist
 Rod Blackmore (born 1935), Australian magistrate
 Roger Blackmore (born 1941), English politician 
 Selwyn Blackmore (born 1972), New Zealand cricketer
 Sophia Blackmore (1857–1945), Australian missionary
 Stephen Blackmore (born 1952), British botanist
 Steve Blackmore (born 1962), Welsh rugby union player
 Susan Blackmore (born 1951), British parapsychologist, writer, and lecturer
 Thomas Blackmore (fl. 1659–1652), English politician
 William Blackmore (minister) (died 1684), English ejected minister
 William Henry Blackmore (1827–1878), English lawyer
 Winston Blackmore, Canadian leader of a polygamous Mormon fundamentalist group

See also
 Lennox Blackmoore (born 1950), Guyanese boxer
 R. P. Blackmur (1904–1965), American literary critic
 Blackmore (disambiguation) (includes titles with "Blackmoor")
 Blackmore, a town in Essex, England

Surnames
Surnames of English origin
Surnames of British Isles origin
English-language surnames